Nadia Prinoth is an Italian luger who competed from the late 1980s to 1990. She won the silver medal in the mixed team event at the 1990 FIL World Luge Championships in Calgary, Alberta, Canada.

References
Hickok sports information on World champions in luge and skeleton.

Italian female lugers
Living people
Year of birth missing (living people)
Italian lugers
Sportspeople from Südtirol